Coldwater or Cold Water may refer to:

Places
In Canada:
 Coldwater, Ontario
 Coldwater First Nation, a Nlaka'pamux First Nations government in British Columbia
 Coldwater 1, also known as Coldwater Indian Reserve No. 1, the main reserve of that First Nation, near Merritt
 Coldwater River (British Columbia), a tributary of the Nicola River
 Coldwater River Provincial Park, British Columbia

In the United States:
 Coldwater, Georgia
 Coldwater, Kansas
 Coldwater, Michigan
Coldwater Spring, historic camp and natural site in Minnesota
 Coldwater, Mississippi
 Coldwater, Missouri
 Coldwater, Ohio
 Coldwater, Texas (disambiguation), three places is the state
 Coldwater, West Virginia
 Coldwater Township, Butler County, Iowa
 Coldwater Township, Branch County, Michigan
 Coldwater Township, Isabella County, Michigan

Books and films
 Cold Water (film), 1994 French motion picture by writer and director Olivier Assayas
 Coldwater, the alternate title of the 2005 film Sabah
 Coldwater (film), a 2013 American motion picture
 Coldwater, 2001 novel by Mardi McConnochie as a reimagination of the lives of the Brontë sisters

Music
 Cold Water (album), 2003 debut album by Mia Dyson
 "Cold Water" (song), by Major Lazer
"Cold Water", song by Railroad Earth from The Black Bear Sessions 
"Cold Water", song by Matthew Good from Chaotic Neutral
"Cold Water", song by Landshapes
"Cold Water", song by Protest the Hero from Pacific Myth
"Cold Water", song by Damien Rice from his 2002 debut album O

See also
 Coldwater Canyon in Los Angeles
 Coldwater Covered Bridge in Alabama
 Coldwater Creek (disambiguation)
 Coldwater fish, aquarium fish that prefer cooler water temperatures
 Coldwater High School (disambiguation)
 Coldwater Lake State Park, Branch County, Michigan
 Coldwater River (disambiguation)
 Cold Water Spring State Preserve in Iowa and Minnesota
 Cold Waters (disambiguation)